There was also a Giorgi I, Catholicos of Kartli who ruled in 677–678.

 
Giorgi I (998 or 1002 – 16 August 1027), of the House of Bagrationi, was the king of Georgia from 1014 until his death in 1027. He was 2nd king of United Georgia after his Father  Bagrat III. He spent most of his thirteen-year-long reign waging a bloody and fruitless territorial war with the Byzantine Empire.

Early reign
Giorgi was born in 998 or, according to a later version of the Georgian chronicles, 1002, to King Bagrat III. Upon his father's death on 7 May 1014, he inherited the kingdoms of Abkhazia, Kartli and Kakheti united into a single state of Georgia. As his predecessor, Giorgi continued to be titled as King of the Abkhazians (Ap'xaz) and Georgians (K'art'velians). Contemporary sources, however, frequently omitted one of the two components of this title when abbreviating it.

The new sovereign's young age was immediately exploited by the great nobles, who had been suppressed under the heavy hand of Bagrat. Around the same year, the easternmost provinces of Kakheti and Hereti, not easily acquired by Bagrat, staged a revolt and reinstated their own government under Kvirike III (1010/1014–1029), who also incorporated a portion of the neighbouring Arran (Ran), allowing him to claim the title of King of the Kakhetians and Ranians. Giorgi was unable to prevent the move and sought an alliance with this kingdom, rather than attempting to reincorporate it into the Georgian state, thus leaving a long-standing claim to Kakheti and Hereti to his successors.

War and peace with Byzantium

The major political and military event during Giorgi's reign, a war against the Byzantine Empire, had its roots back to the 990s, when the Georgian prince David III Kuropalates, following his abortive rebellion against Emperor Basil II, had to agree to cede his extensive possessions in Tao and the neighbouring lands to the emperor on his death. All the efforts by David's stepson and Giorgi's father, Bagrat III, to prevent these territories from being annexed to the empire went in vain. Young and ambitious, Giorgi launched a campaign to restore the Kuropalates’ succession to Georgia and occupied Tao in 1015–1016. He also entered in an alliance with the Fatimid Caliph of Egypt, Al-Hakim (996–1021), that put Basil in a difficult situation, forcing him to refrain from an acute response to Giorgi's offensive.

Beyond that, the Byzantines were at that time involved in a relentless war with the Bulgarian Empire, limiting their actions to the west. But as soon as Bulgaria was conquered, and Al-Hakim was no more alive, Basil led his army against Georgia (1021). An exhausting war lasted for two years, and ended in a decisive Byzantine victory, forcing Giorgi to agree to a peace treaty, in which he had not only to abandon his claims to Tao, but to surrender several of his southwestern possessions to Basil, and to give his three-year-old son, Bagrat, as hostage. Following the peace treaty, Constantinople was visited by Catholicos-Patriarch Melchizedek I of Georgia, who gained Byzantine financial aid for the construction of "Svetitskhoveli" (literally, the Living Pillar), a major Orthodox cathedral in the eastern Georgian town of Mtskheta.

Afterwards, Basil kept the peace with Georgia, permitting prince Bagrat to return home two years later (1025): but the new emperor, Constantine VIII, who succeeded upon the death of Basil, decided to bring Bagrat back to Constantinople. However, the imperial courier could not overtake the prince – he was already in the Georgian possessions. The Byzantine-Georgian relations subsequently deteriorated, particularly after a conspiracy, organized by  Nikephoros Komnenos, the katepano of Vaspurakan, and allegedly involving Giorgi I, was brought to light.

Giorgi was evidently preparing to take revenge for his defeat, but he died suddenly in Trialeti on 16 August 1027. He was buried in the Bagrati Cathedral in his capital Kutaisi. A recently discovered grave, presumably robbed in the 19th century, is proposed to have belonged to Giorgi I.

Family
Giorgi I was married twice – first to the Armenian princess Mariam of Vaspurakan with whom he had a son called Bagrat and daughters: Guarandukht, Marta, and Kata; and second to Alde of Alania, who gave birth to a son, Demetre.

In literature
The most important representation of Giorgi I in historical fiction is probably in Konstantine Gamsakhurdia's magnum opus, The Hand of the Great Master. The author has often noted that he has been deeply interested in George's character and historical figure for a long time, as well as his reign full of turmoil and turbulence. In the story, the king is portrayed as a philanderer who enjoys feasting in low-class taverns with his comrades disguised as random peasants. The author seems to be emphasizing on the king's human, fleshly wishes and desires, despite his position on the social ladder, such as lust, love, loathing and compassion.

References

Lordkipanidze, Mariam (1987), Georgia in the XI-XII centuries, Ganatleba, edited by George B. Hewitt. Also available online at 
Rapp, SH (2003), Studies In Medieval Georgian Historiography: Early Texts And Eurasian Contexts, Peeters Bvba 
Suny, RG (1994), The Making of the Georgian Nation (2nd Edition), Bloomington and Indianapolis, 

1027 deaths
Bagrationi dynasty of the Kingdom of Georgia
Kings of Georgia
Medieval child monarchs
11th-century monarchs in Asia
Eastern Orthodox monarchs
Year of birth uncertain